This is a list of the states and union territories of India ranked in order of percentage of households having electricity as the source of lighting. This information is based on 2011 and 2001 data as published by 2011 census of India and 2015-16 National Family Health Survey (NFHS). In default display, the rankings of 2016 are based on 2015-16 NFHS data. Latest data ( April 2019) is based on the Saubhagya scheme portal hosted by Power Ministry.

Between 2010 and 2016, India provided electricity to 30 million people each year, more than any other country, the World Bank said in its latest report released in March 2018. 
While the percentage of electrified households under Saubhagya is somewhat disputed, it has been acknowledged by various non-governmental organisations that a very huge number (around 30 million) of households were electrified under the scheme. 

In 2006, Gujarat became the first state to fully electrify all its villages followed by Andhra Pradesh in 2016 and Kerala in 2017. Kerala in 2017 became the first state to fully electrify all its households. By 2018, eight other states have achieved 100 per cent saturation in household electrification under Saubhagya namely Madhya Pradesh, Tripura, Bihar, Jammu and Kashmir, Mizoram, Sikkim, Telangana and West Bengal, and by 2019, 15 States in the country achieved hundred percent household electrification.

Note:- The Saubhagya percentages does not count the households who have 'willingly not taken connections' as not electrified. In an interview to the Rajya Sabha TV R.K Singh, the power minister had said that the parts of Chhattisgarh left out are the ones that fall in the Bastar region where the Naxals hold the sway.

List

See also
 Electricity sector in India
 Energy policy of India

References

External links
 NFHS site
 Garv

Rural electrification
Demographics of India
Rural development in India
Electric power in India
Economy of India lists